The Chicago Steel are members of the United States Hockey League, joining the league in 2000. The Steel have played their home games at Fox Valley Ice Arena in Geneva, Illinois, since 2015; previously, the team played at Edge Ice Arena in Bensenville, Illinois, from 2000 to 2015.

History
The Fargo-Moorhead Ice Sharks, founded in 1996, moved to Bensenville, Illinois, and became the Chicago Steel in 2000. In May 2015, the majority ownership of the Steel was purchased by Larry Robbins while then current owners Bruce Liimatainen and Mike Greenberg remained involved as minority owners.  The announcement for the change of ownership was accompanied by a change of leadership as Ryan Bennett and Dan Muse were hired as the new general manager and head coach, respectively.

On May 22, 2017, the Steel defeated the Sioux City Musketeers 2–1 in overtime of game five, finishing a 3-games-to-2 series win to claim the franchise's first Clark Cup. Head coach Dan Muse would then be hired by the National Hockey League's Nashville Predators as an assistant coach and Mark Abalan would take over as head coach of the Steel. On January 2, 2018, Abalan was let go and Ryan Cruthers was named interim head coach and assistant general manager of the Steel. During the 2018 Clark Cup playoffs, the interim tag was removed and Cruthers was named the permanent head coach, however, Cruthers would leave the team in May 2018 when the Steel hired Ryan Hardy as general manager. Greg Moore was then hired as the head coach for the 2018–19 season after previously serving as an assistant with Team USA. In 2019, Moore left to become head coach of the Toronto Marlies of the American Hockey League and Brock Sheahan was promoted to head coach. The Steel then won the regular season championship, the Anderson Cup, in the pandemic-shortened 2019–20 season. The Steel won a second-straight Anderson Cup in the shortened 2020–21 season and subsequently won their second Clark Cup as playoff champions.

Notable alumni
 Jake Chelios, played for the Detroit Red Wings, son of Chris Chelios
 Matt Clackson, former American Hockey League (AHL) player and son of Kim Clackson
 Dennis Gilbert, played for the Chicago Blackhawks
 Tom Gilbert, played for the Edmonton Oilers, Minnesota Wild, Florida Panthers, Montreal Canadiens, and Los Angeles Kings
 Drew LeBlanc, played two games for the Chicago Blackhawks
 Andrew Miller, played for the Edmonton Oilers
 John Moore, played for the Columbus Blue Jackets, New York Rangers, Arizona Coyotes, New Jersey Devils, and Boston Bruins as well as an 2011 AHL All-Star
 Travis Morin, played for the Dallas Stars
 Jamie Oleksiak, plays for the Seattle Kraken
 Danny Richmond, played for the Carolina Hurricanes and Chicago Blackhawks
 Philip Samuelsson, played for Pittsburgh Penguins and Arizona Coyotes, son of Ulf Samuelsson
 Jaccob Slavin, plays for the Carolina Hurricanes
 Lee Sweatt, played for the Vancouver Canucks
 Owen Power, 1st overall pick in the 2021 NHL draft, plays for the Buffalo Sabres

Team spirit
The team mascot is a dog named Rusty. Occasionally also seen at Steel home games is a puppy named Rascal.

Roster
As of December 24, 2022.

|}

References

External links
 Chicago Steel Hockey Team Official site

2000 establishments in Illinois
Amateur ice hockey teams in Illinois
Bensenville, Illinois
Steel
Ice hockey clubs established in 2000
United States Hockey League teams
Sports in Kane County, Illinois
Geneva, Illinois